; (born 7 November 1991) is a Japanese long-distance runner. She competed in the marathon event at the 2015 World Championships in Athletics in Beijing, China.

References

External links

1991 births
Living people
Japanese female long-distance runners
Japanese female marathon runners
World Athletics Championships athletes for Japan
Place of birth missing (living people)